Wang Qingqing (born August 21, 1991) is a Chinese champion Renju player.

Early life 
On August 21, 1991, Wang was born in Huoqiu, Anhui, China.

Career 
In 2009, Wang won the champion in the Women's Renju League of the 1st Chinese National Mind Sport Tournament. By 2018, she has won the Women's League of the Chinese National Renju Championship for 5 times. In 2014, she won the Men's League of the Chinese National Open Tournament, becoming the first female player who has ever won in a men's league of an official national Renju tournament in China. In 2014, she won the Girls' U23 League of the Youth World Championship in Renju. In 2015 and 2017, she got the second place in the Women World Championship in Renju for two times.

References 

1991 births
Living people
Chinese Renju players
Sportspeople from Anhui